James Davis Spence (21 March 1935 – 9 September 2004) was a British ice hockey player. He played for various British clubs between 1950 and 1973. He also played for the Great Britain national ice hockey team three times between 1961 and 1973. He was inducted to the British Ice Hockey Hall of Fame in 2006.

External links
British Ice Hockey Hall of Fame entry

1934 births
2004 deaths
British Ice Hockey Hall of Fame inductees
Dundee Rockets players
Fife Flyers players
Nottingham Panthers players
Sportspeople from Edinburgh
Scottish ice hockey centres